= The Secret Vice =

2008 non-fiction book by Diane Mason

The Secret Vice: Masturbation in Victorian Fiction and Medical Culture
- Author: Diane Mason
- Publisher: Manchester University Press
- Publication date: 1 August 2008
- ISBN: 9780719077142

The Secret Vice: Masturbation in Victorian Fiction and Medical Culture is a nonfiction book by Diane Mason. It was originally published in 2008 by Manchester University Press.
